Luís Alberto Figueira Gonçalves Jardim (born 4 July 1950) is a Portuguese percussionist, born in the Madeira Island, best known for his work with producer Trevor Horn.

Family
Jardim is a cousin of Alberto João Jardim (former president of the regional government of Madeira).
His first wife was Linda Jardim (nee Allan), a successful session singer and lead vocal in the Buggles hit "Video Killed the Radio Star".  They had two daughters together, Gabrielle and Rebecca.  He was married to his second wife, Maria Jardim in 1987 and had two daughters together, Natassia and Stefania.  He is now in a relationship with Teresa Silveira.

Musical work
Jardim's career includes music composition, production, arrangements, and studio work. He took part in the UK selection process for the Eurovision Song Contest 1981, fronting the group 'Headache' in the A Song for Europe contest broadcast on BBC1. The song, "Not Without Your Ticket (Don't Go)", placed 7th of the 8 entries.

Beginning with ABC's debut The Lexicon of Love in 1981/82, Jardim has worked extensively on projects with Trevor Horn, including with Seal and on Grace Jones' Slave to the Rhythm, including playing bass on the title track. He produced 'Everything Could Be So Perfect', the debut album by Anne Pigalle for Horn's ZTT label.  He went on "tournées" with Tina Turner, George Michael, Rod Stewart, etc.
Luís Jardim plays various instruments. He's best known for playing drums, bass, percussion, and guitars. He played live at the 2004 Produced by Trevor Horn show and with The Producers in 2006/7.

He has worked with Madness (on Keep Moving and Mad Not Mad), Asia (on Astra and Arena and Aura), Claire Martin (Take My Heart), Yes, Sir Paul McCartney, The Rolling Stones, They Might Be Giants, Mike Batt, David Bowie, Cher, Grace Jones, Björk, Mezzoforte, Bee Gees, Duran Duran, Robbie Williams, Elvis Costello, Gareth Gates, Tom Jones, Alejandro Sanz, Nina Hagen, João Pedro Pais, Eros Ramazzoti, Diana Ross, Rod Stewart, Johnny Hallyday, Mariah Carey, Céline Dion, Sir Elton John, George Michael, Cyndi Lauper, Gloria Estefan, Katie Melua, Modern Romance, Jeff Beck, Fish, Tina Turner, Roddy Frame, Billy Idol, Coldplay, David Gilmour, Tears For Fears and many others.

Work on Portuguese TV
Jardim became best known in Portugal after his appearance on the Portuguese version of Pop Idol and on other music talent shows on Portuguese television channels. He was then a judge on Uma Canção Para Ti (A song for you), a talent show for young people (between 8 and 15 years old) for two seasons. He was a judge on A Tua Cara Não Me é Estranha, a show where 8 Portuguese celebrities in the field of acting and music mime (vocal and physically, including resorting to blackface frequently) a randomly selected musician every week.

Collaborations 

With Asia
 Arena (Bullet Proof, 1996)
 Aura (Recognition, 2001)

With Beverley Craven
 Love Scenes (Epic, 1993)
 Mixed Emotions (Epic, 1999)

With Bryan Ferry
 Taxi (Virgin, 1993)
 Mamouna (Virgin, 1994)

With Frankie Goes to Hollywood
 Welcome to the Pleasuredome (ZTT, 1984)
 Liverpool (ZTT, 1986)

With Clive Griffin
 Step By Step (Mercury, 1989)
 Clive Griffin (Epic, 1993)

With Nina Hagen
 Nina Hagen (Mercury, 1989)
 Street (Mercury, 1991)

With Holly Johnson
 Blast (MCA, 1989)
 Soulstream (Pleasuredome, 1999)

With Annie Lennox
 Diva (Arista, 1992)
 Medusa (Arista, 1995)

With Seal
 Seal (Warner Bros., 2003)
 7 (Warner Bros., 2015)

With Wet Wet Wet
 Holding Back the River (Mercury, 1989)
 10 (Mercury, 1997)

With Robbie Williams
 Escapology (Chrysalis, 2002)
 Reality Killed the Video Star (Virgin, 2009)

With others
 Oleta Adams, Circle of One (Fontana, 1990)
 Joan Armatrading, Square the Circle (A&M, 1992)
 Spandau Ballet, Heart Like a Sky (CBS, 1989)
 Bee Gees, Size Isn't Everything (Polydor, 1993)
 Black, Black (A&M, 1991)
 Boyzone, Where We Belong (Polydor, 1998)
 The Buggles, Adventures in Modern Recording (CBS, 1981)
 Paul Carrack, Blue Views (I.R.S., 1995)
 Eric Clapton, Pilgrim (Reprise, 1998)
 Coldplay, Mylo Xyloto (Capitol, 2011)
 Elvis Costello, Goodbye Cruel World (F-Beat, 1984)
 Marie-Claire D'Ubaldo, Marie Claire D'Ubaldo (Polydor, 1994)
 Céline Dion, One Heart (Columbia, 2003)
 Duran Duran, Liberty (Parlophone, 1990)
 Matt Dusk, Two Shots (Decca, 2004)
 Julia Fordham, Julia Fordham (Virgin, 1988)
 Noel Gallagher's High Flying Birds, Noel Gallagher's High Flying Birds (Sour Mash, 2011)
 David Gilmour, About Face (Harvest, 1984)
 Sophie B. Hawkins, Whaler (Columbia, 1994)
 Murray Head, Sooner or Later (Virgin, 1987)
 Yusuf Islam, An Other Cup (Atlantic, 2006)
 Garland Jeffreys, Wildlife Dictionary (MCA, 1997)
 Duncan James, Future Past (Innocent, 2006)
 Grace Jones, Slave to the Rhythm (Island, 1985)
 Juanes, P.A.R.C.E. (Universal Music, 2010)
 Howard Jones, People (Ark 21, 1998)
 John Legend, Evolver (Columbia, 2008)
 Lighthouse Family, Postcards from Heaven (Polydor, 1997)
 Barry Manilow, Barry Manilow (Arista, 1989)
 Melanie C, Reason (Virgin, 2003)
 Mark Owen, Green Man (RCA, 1996)
 The Neville Brothers, Uptown (EMI, 1987)
 Nerina Pallot, Dear Frustrated Superstar (Polydor, 2001)
 Pet Shop Boys, Fundamental (Parlophone, 2006)
 Maggie Reilly, Elena (EMI, 1996)
 Jennifer Rush, Credo (EMI, 1997)
 Michael W. Smith, Live the Life (Reunion, 1998)
 Dusty Springfield, Reputation (Parlophone, 1990)
 Lisa Stansfield, The Moment (Edel, 2004)
 Tears for Fears, The Seeds of Love (Fontana, 1989)
 Tanita Tikaram, The Cappuccino Songs (Mother, 1998)
 Wham!, Fantastic (Columbia, 1983)
 Will Young, Keep On (19 Recordings, 2005)

References

External links
[ Allmusic]
Discogs

Living people
People from Madeira
Portuguese session musicians
Portuguese emigrants to the United Kingdom
Portuguese percussionists
20th-century Portuguese musicians
20th-century Portuguese male musicians
21st-century Portuguese musicians
1950 births
20th-century male musicians
21st-century male musicians